Syed Shah Mohammed Hussaini (29 December 1922 – 2007) was an Indian educationalist and social worker.

In 2004 he was awarded the Padma Shri in the field of literature and education. He died in 2007.

References

External links
 Padma Shri for Hussaini

1922 births
2007 deaths
20th-century Indian educational theorists
Indian Muslims
Recipients of the Padma Shri in literature & education